"Fake It" is a song by American Christian pop artist Tauren Wells featuring Aaron Cole. It was released on February 25, 2022, as the lead single from Wells' third album Joy in the Morning. Wells and Cole co-wrote the song with Chris Stevens and Emily Weisband. Chris Steven collaborated with Tedd T in producing the single.

"Fake It" peaked at No. 16 on the US Hot Christian Songs chart, and No. 8 on the Hot Gospel Songs chart. "Fake It" won the GMA Dove Award for Short Form Video of the Year (Performance) at the 2022 GMA Dove Awards.

Background
Tauren Wells released "Fake It" featuring Aaron Cole on February 25, 2022, as the lead single from his upcoming album slated for release later in the year. "Fake It" marks Wells first release following his signing with Capitol Christian Music Group.

Writing and development
In an interview with American Songwriter, Tauren Wells shared that the song came about from conversations about life in the studio, where Chris Stevens then shared a track he had which everyone got excited about and enjoyed. Wells then reached out to Aaron Cole for the writing of the bridge, with Cole responding within the hour.

Composition
"Fake It" is composed in the key of C minor with a tempo of 115 beats per minute.

Accolades

Commercial performance
"Fake It" debuted at number 31 on the US Christian Airplay chart dated March 5, 2022.

"Fake It" debuted at No. 26 on the US Hot Christian Songs, and No. 10 on the Hot Gospel Songs charts dated March 12, 2022.

Music videos
Tauren Wells released the official visualizer for the song via YouTube on February 25, 2022. The official music video of "Fake It" premiered on Facebook exclusively on the same day. The video, filmed in Los Angeles, showcases Wells performing the song alongside Cole and a group of dancers. The music video was produced by Raj Kapoor and directed by Noah Clark. On February 27, 2022, the "Fake It" music video was availed on YouTube. On March 21, 2022, Tauren Wells released the live performance video of "Fake It" which was filmed at Vevo Studio in Brooklyn, New York.

Choreography by Alexander Chung

Track listing

Personnel
Adapted from AllMusic.
 Josh Bailey — A&R
 Aaron Cole — featured artist, vocals
 John Greenham — mastering engineer
 Jake Halm — co-arranger, editing, engineer, mixing, programmer
 Javier Solís — engineer, percussion
 Chris Stevens — co-arranger, editing, engineer, producer, programmer, vocals
 Tedd T — co-arranger, editing, engineer, mixing, producer, programmer
 Emily Weisband — vocals
 Tauren Wells — primary artist, vocals
 Cory Wong — engineer, guitar

Charts

Weekly charts

Year-end charts

Release history

References

External links
 
 

2022 songs
2022 singles
Tauren Wells songs
Songs written by Christopher Stevens (musician)
Songs written by Emily Weisband